N-Ethylhexylone is a recreational designer drug from the substituted cathinone family, with stimulant effects. It was first identified in Poland in August 2019. It is illegal in Taiwan since July 2020, where it had been sold mixed with plant material under the name 彩虹菸 ("Rainbow Tobacco" or "Rainbow Smoke").

See also
 3F-NEH
 4F-PHP
 5-Methylethylone
 Ethylone
 Eutylone
 Ephylone
 Isohexylone
 MDPV
 MDPHP
 N-Ethylhexedrone
 N-Ethylheptylone

References 

Cathinones
Designer drugs
Norepinephrine–dopamine reuptake inhibitors